Ahn Il-joo (born 2 May 1988) is a South Korean professional footballer who plays for Daejeon Citizen in K League 2 as a defender.

External links 

1988 births
Living people
Association football defenders
Pohang Steelers players
Gimcheon Sangmu FC players
Bucheon FC 1995 players
Daejeon Hana Citizen FC players
K League 1 players
K League 2 players
Korea National League players
South Korean footballers
People from Pohang
Sportspeople from North Gyeongsang Province